Josef Charous (15 June 1894 – 5 August 1943) was a Czech equestrian. He competed at the 1924 Summer Olympics and the 1928 Summer Olympics. He was killed in the Auschwitz concentration camp during World War II.

References

External links
 

1894 births
1943 deaths
Czech male equestrians
Olympic equestrians of Czechoslovakia
Equestrians at the 1924 Summer Olympics
Equestrians at the 1928 Summer Olympics
People from Kolín District
Czech people who died in Auschwitz concentration camp
Czechoslovak civilians killed in World War II
Sportspeople from the Central Bohemian Region